Bourton Down is an  biological Site of Special Scientific Interest near Bourton-on-the-Hill in Gloucestershire, notified in 1974. The site is listed in the 'Cotswold District' Local Plan 2001-2011 (on line) as a Key Wildlife Site (KWS).

Location and habitat
The site lies within the Cotswold Area of Outstanding Natural Beauty and is one of a series of grassland sites on Jurassic limestone. The site supports the Pasqueflower which is of some importance as there are few remaining sites. The site also supports Bastard Toadflax, and has good populations of Early Purple Orchid and Bee Orchid.

References

SSSI Source
 Natural England SSSI information on the citation
 Natural England SSSI information on the Bourton Down unit

External links
 Natural England (SSSI information)

Sites of Special Scientific Interest in Gloucestershire
Sites of Special Scientific Interest notified in 1974
Cotswolds